Zaw One (born Thaung Dan; 17 July 1945 – 12 August 2009) was a Burmese actor and singer. He was famous as Thingyan Minthar Gyi in Myanmar.

Biography
Zaw One was born Thaung Dan on 17 July 1945, in Mandalay, son of Mya Mya and "Taingchit" Thakin Thein Pe. He attended Taingchit High School in Mandalay. He received singing lessons from Bo Kin, founder of the Moe Kaythi Amateur Band, and later sang with the band. He then studied acting with Shumawa U Kyaw, a famous director. Zaw One made many films. His first role was in Chwe Ka Lay So So, directed by Shumawa U Kyaw. The film Say Lo Yar Say made him famous. He was particularly famous for the film Thingyan Moe. He also made a few albums as a singer.

He died on 12 August 2009, from liver disease in Yangon. He was survived by his wife Thant Shwe Zin Win, four children, and nine grandchildren.

Filmography
 Chwe Ka Lay So So
 Say Lo Yar Say
 Thingyan Moe
 Lu Ma Naw
 Nay Htut Taw Nya
 Ta Kha Ga Ta Bawa
 Myitta Bon Tho Nit Khaund
 Kyauntaw Nit Ko Ba Kyaw
 Doe Nit Youk Nit Mi Nyein Chan
 Bal Thu Pyaing Lo Hla Par Taw Naing
 Kyaw Go Chit Ma La, Zaw Go Chit Ma La
 Ngwe Yupa
 Hot Shot (2)
 Hot Shot (3)

References

Burmese male film actors
1945 births
2009 deaths
Deaths from liver disease
20th-century Burmese male singers
20th-century Burmese male actors